Zaprzytnica  is a settlement in the administrative district of Gmina Sobolew, within Garwolin County, Masovian Voivodeship, in east-central Poland.

References

Zaprzytnica